Luksnėnai is a village in Alytus district municipality, in Alytus County, in south Lithuania. According to the 2001 census, the village has a population of 614 people.

References

Alytus District Municipality
Villages in Alytus County